Tetragram or tetragraph generally refers to any a group of four letters, but more specifically may refer to:
 Tetragraph, in orthography, referring to a sequence of four letters that represent sounds not necessarily corresponding to those of the individual letters
 Tetragrammaton, a Hebrew name for God written as YHWH
 Complete quadrilateral, a geometric system of four lines and their six points of intersection
 Tetragraph (from Chinese ), referring to Chinese characters written on squared graph paper
 A symbol with four lines in Taixuanjing
 A degenerate star polygon, usually represented as a compound of two digons

See also
, including multiple scientific names